Oburu Ng'ong'a Oginga (born 15 October 1943) is a Kenyan politician who is currently serving as senator for Siaya County, having been elected in the elections of August 2022. He is an immediate former member for the East African Legislative Assembly, based in Arusha Tanzania. He is the former assistant minister for finance in the 2008 Grand Coalition government and former Member of the Parliament, Kenya.

Oburu is from the known Odinga family. His brother Raila Odinga was second in the Presidential elections of December 2007, March 2013, August 2017, and August 2022. His late father Jaramogi Oginga Odinga was a prominent politician at the time of independence, serving as Kenya's first vice-president. He was an elected MP from Bondo Constituency. His sister Ruth Odinga is the former Deputy Governor of Kisumu who served from 2013 to 2017.

On 11 December 2017, Oburu was approved by the senate to represent Kenya at the EALA.
On the 25th of November 2021, Oburu Oginga launched his Autobiography titled 'In the Shadow of My Father'. He narrated his life story to one of Kenya's famous historiographers Bethuel Oduo who was Oburu's publishing consultant for the memoir writing.

He vied for senatorial seat in Siaya on the 2022 elections and won. He now serves as the senator for Siaya County.

References

External links
https://web.archive.org/web/20100416122537/http://www.raila07.com/
https://web.archive.org/web/20071109172613/http://www.mzalendo.com/Members.Details.php?ID=152
https://www.capitalfm.co.ke/news/2017/12/kennedy-kalonzo-oburu-mbugua-elected-eala/
http://www.nation.co.ke/news/politics/Graft-claims--party-politics-cost-Ranguma-his-seat-/1064-4060052-o1oi3b/index.html

1943 births
Living people
Orange Democratic Movement politicians
Local politicians in Kenya
Members of the National Assembly (Kenya)
Members of the East African Legislative Assembly
Alumni of Maranda High School